The 2022–23 Sapling Cup (named as Jockey Club Sapling Cup for sponsorship reasons) is the 8th edition of the Sapling Cup. The competition is contested by the 10 teams in the 2022–23 Hong Kong Premier League. Each team is required to field a minimum of three players born on or after 1 January 2001 (U-22) and a maximum of six foreign players during every whole match, with no more than five foreign players on the pitch at the same time.

Eastern are the defending champions.

The champions of the Jockey Club Sapling Cup will receive HKD$120,000 in prize money, and HKD$100,000 donation to the champions' specified organization, while the runner-up will receive HKD$60,000, and HKD$50,000 donation to the runner-up's specified organization. In addition, the two losing teams in semi-finals will receive HK$30,000 while the remaining teams will receive HK$15,000.

In addition, the best U-22 player in each team will receive a prize of HKD$3,000. The most outstanding U-22 player among the selected best U-22 player from each team will receive an additional of HKD$5,000 for being the best of all the U-22 players.

Calendar

Group stage

Group A

Group B

Semi-finals
The semi-final will take place on 18–19 April 2023.

Final
The final will take place on 13 May 2023 at Mong Kok Stadium.

Top scorers

U-22 Player Prize Winners

Remarks

References

2022–23 domestic association football cups
Sapling Cup
Hong Kong Sapling Cup